Dioxygen difluoride is a compound of fluorine and oxygen with the molecular formula O2F2. Dioxygen difluoride reacts vigorously with nearly every chemical it encounters (including ordinary ice) leading to its onomatopoeic nickname FOOF (a play on its chemical structure and its explosive tendencies).

Preparation 
Dioxygen difluoride can be obtained by subjecting a 1:1 mixture of gaseous fluorine and oxygen at low pressure (7–17 mmHg (0.9–2.3 kPa) is optimal) to an electric discharge of 25–30 mA at 2.1–2.4 kV.
A similar method was used for the first synthesis by Otto Ruff in 1933. All of these methods involve synthesis according to the equation

  +  →  

It also arises from the thermal decomposition of ozone difluoride:
 2  → 2  +

Structure and properties 
In , oxygen is assigned the unusual oxidation state of +1. In most of its other compounds, oxygen has an oxidation state of −2.

The structure of dioxygen difluoride resembles that of hydrogen peroxide, in its large dihedral angle, which approaches 90° and C2 symmetry. This geometry conforms with the predictions of VSEPR theory.

The bonding within dioxygen difluoride has been the subject of considerable speculation, particularly because of the very short O−O distance and the long O−F distances. The O−O bond length is within 2 pm of the 120.7 pm distance for the O=O double bond in the dioxygen molecule, . Several bonding systems have been proposed to explain this, including an O−O triple bond with O−F single bonds destabilised and lengthened by repulsion between the lone pairs on the fluorine atoms and the π orbitals of the O−O bond. Repulsion involving the fluorine lone pairs is also responsible for the long and weak covalent bonding in the fluorine molecule.
Computational chemistry indicates that dioxygen difluoride has an exceedingly high barrier to rotation of 81.17 kJ/mol around the O−O bond (in hydrogen peroxide the barrier is 29.45 kJ/mol), this is close to the O−F bond disassociation energy of 81.59 kJ/mol.

The 19F NMR chemical shift of dioxygen difluoride is 865 ppm, which is by far the highest chemical shift recorded for a fluorine nucleus, thus underlining the extraordinary electronic properties of this compound. Despite its instability, thermochemical data for  have been compiled.

Reactivity 
The compound readily decomposes into oxygen and fluorine.

  →   + 

The other main property of this unstable compound is its oxidizing power, although most experimental reactions have been conducted near . Several experiments with the compound resulted in a series of fires and explosions. Some of the compounds that produced violent reactions with  include ethyl alcohol, methane, ammonia, and even water ice.

2  + 2  →  2  +

Uses 
The compound currently has no practical applications, but has been of theoretical interest. One laboratory used it to synthesize plutonium hexafluoride at unprecedentedly low temperatures, which was significant because previous methods for preparation needed temperatures so high that the plutonium hexafluoride created would decompose rapidly.

See also 
 Chlorine trifluoride
 A. G. Streng

References

External links 
 

Fluorides
Nonmetal halides
Oxygen compounds
Oxidizing agents
Chalcohalides
Substances discovered in the 1930s